Volleyball at the 1995 All-Africa Games was held in Bulawayo, Zimbabwe for both genders men and women.

Events

Medal table

Medal summary

Medal table

References

External links
Men's Competitions
Women's Competitions

Volleyball at the African Games
A
1995 All-Africa Games